Unione Sportiva Avellino 1912, commonly known as US Avellino, is an Italian professional football club based in Avellino, Campania. It competes in Serie C, the third tier of Italian football.

It is the official continuity club of US Avellino 1912, known worldwide for having competed in Serie A for ten consecutive seasons, from 1978-1979 to 1987-1988. The team went through two major reboots: once, in 2009, when it went bankrupt, and then, in 2018, when it was excluded from Serie B. In both cases, new clubs were founded to join the Serie D league.

The club was renamed as Avellino Calcio.12 Società Sportiva Dilettantistica in 2009, then Associazione Sportiva Avellino 1912 in 2010, and restored to the original Unione Sportiva Avellino 1912 in 2015, although initially taking the name Calcio Avellino Società Sportiva Dilettantistica for the 2018-2019 season.

History

Foundation
The club was founded as U.S. Avellino on 12 December 1912 to give the town of Avellino a footballing representative. The early history of the club is quite obscure as they only competed at a lower level against regional sides. Avellino competed in IV Divisione from 1913 until after the Second World War; today's equivalent of that level is Serie D.

Post-war emergence
For the earlier part of their history the club did not achieve anything of note, until being placed in Serie C for the 1945–46 post-War season. In the 1946–47 season they narrowly missed out on getting through to the interregional final, after finishing third in their group.

Avellino beat out the likes of Catania, Reggina and Messina to win promotion to Serie B at the end of the 1940s. However, the club were accused of match fixing and the federation decided to strip them of their promotion, instead relegating them down to Serie D. Although they were able to return to Serie C after one season, Avellino were relegated back down to spend six seasons in a row at Serie D level.

Eventually Avellino returned, but, in the space of six seasons, Avellino gained promotion to Serie C in three of them and were relegated back down twice.

1970s: rise and ten consecutive seasons in Serie A

Avellino were promoted to Serie B in 1973 and Serie A in 1978. A truly remarkable feat for a southern provincial side was a 10-year stay in Serie A between 1978 and 1988, with the club holding a mid-table place for the majority of that period. Their best finish was 8th in 1987, with a team starring Angelo Alessio, Paolo Benedetti, Franco Colomba and Dirceu.

1990s and 2000s: decline, ups and downs, and bankruptcy 
The club tended to shift between Serie B and Serie C1 in the decade following relegation from Serie A in 1988.

The club marked a surprising Serie B return after defeating neighbors and football powerhouse Napoli in the 2004-05 Serie C1/B play-off finals. An unsuccessful 2005–06 campaign ended in a loss on relegation playoffs to Albinoleffe (0–2, 3–2). The 2006–07 season, with Giuseppe Galderisi as head coach, then replaced by Giovanni Vavassori, ended in a second place in the Serie C1/B regular season; this was then followed by a successful campaign in the promotion play-offs, in which Avellino defeated Foggia in the finals, being therefore promoted to Serie B once again. However, this was followed by Vavassori's resignations on 16 July 2007, shortly after his confirmation as Avellino boss, being then replaced by Maurizio Sarri two days later. Sarri himself resigned one month later, being replaced by Guido Carboni and later Alessandro Calori. Despite this, the club did not manage to escape relegation, ending the season in 19th place. The club was however readmitted to Serie B later on to fill a league vacancy created by Messina's disbandment.

The team finished second from bottom in the 2008–09 season and was therefore relegated again. On 9 July 2009, the Covisoc (Commissione di Vigilanza sulle Società Calcistiche, Vigilancy Commission on Football Clubs) organization announced that the team did not pass the financial requirements in order to be admitted to the league. The club was allowed to appeal the decision until 11 July 2009. On 11 July, Avellino failed to appeal the exclusion.

Avellino Calcio.12 S.S.D. restarts from Serie D
A new club founded in the summer 2009 as Avellino Calcio.12 S.S.D. restarts from Serie D, finishing 5th, but 4 August 2010 they were later admitted to Lega Pro Seconda Divisione to fill vacancies. This ordeal saw them become the latest in a long line of Italian clubs that have faced severe financial difficulties, such as Napoli and Fiorentina.

From Lega Pro Seconda Divisione to Serie B
In the 2010–11 season the team became Associazione Sportiva Avellino 1912 and played in Lega Pro Seconda Divisione finishing 4th, being defeated by Trapani in the play-off final, but 4 August 2011 it was later admitted to Lega Pro Prima Divisione, again, to fill vacancies. In the season 2012–13 Avellino won Lega Pro Prima Divisione and the team obtained the promotion in Serie B, under manager Massimo Rastelli. In 2014-2015, Rastelli led the team to the play-off semi-finals, when they are eliminated by the more prestigious Bologna team despite a 3-2 win away.

2018 Serie B exclusion
In 2018, Avellino was excluded from Serie B due to submitting a league membership paperwork that was deemed as incomplete, due to a late bank guarantee. Due to this, a new club was re-founded within days in order to submit application to play at Serie D instead. In 2019 Avellino won Serie D and the Scudetto Serie D, reaching the promotion in Serie C for the next season. In 2020-2021, they once again reached the play-off semi-finals, losing to Padova.

Colours and badge
Its traditional colours are green and white.
Avellino are nicknamed the "Lupi", which means wolf, and their club crest displays a wolf head.

Players
As of 31 January 2023.

Out on loan

Retired numbers
10 –  Adriano Lombardi, Midfielder (1975–79) – posthumous honor, number retired in 2007.

Notable former players

Notable former coaches

 Antonio Vojak (1947)
 Oronzo Pugliese (1974–75)
 Giuseppe Baldini (1976–77)
 Luís Vinício (1980–82)
 Giuseppe Marchioro (1982)
 Fernando Veneranda (1982–84)
 Ottavio Bianchi (1983–84)
 Tomislav Ivić (1985–86)
 Luís Vinício (1986–88)
 Enzo Ferrari (1988)
 Eugenio Fascetti (1988–89)
 Nedo Sonetti (1989–90)
 Adriano Lombardi (1989–90)
 Bruno Bolchi (1991–92)
 Francesco Graziani (1991–92)
 Adriano Lombardi (1992–93)
 Giuseppe Papadopulo (1994–95)
 Zbigniew Boniek (1994–96)
 Corrado Orrico (1995–96)
 Giuliano Zoratti (1996–97)
 Adriano Lombardi (1997–98)
 Giuliano Sonzogni (2001–02)
 Massimo Ficcadenti (2002)
 Zdeněk Zeman (2003–04)
 Antonello Cuccureddu (2004–05)
 Franco Colomba (2005–06)
 Giuseppe Galderisi (2006–07)
 Giovanni Vavassori (2007)
 Maurizio Sarri (2007)
 Guido Carboni (2007–08)
 Alessandro Calori (2008)
 Giuseppe Incocciati (2008)
 Salvatore Campilongo (2008–09)
 Giovanni Bucaro (2011–12)
 Massimo Rastelli (2012–15)
 Attilio Tesser (2015–16)
 Walter Novellino (2016–18)

Honours
Serie B
Runners-up: 1977–1978
Serie C1
Champions: 2002–03, 2012–13
Runners-up: 1994–95, 2004–05, 2006–07
Coppa Italia Serie C
Runners-up: 1972–73
Supercoppa di Lega di Prima Divisione
Champions: 2013
Serie D
Champions: 1961–1962, 1963–1964, 2018–2019
Scudetto Serie D
Champions: 2018–2019

Competitions

References

External links
 Official Site

 
Football clubs in Italy
Football clubs in Campania
Avellino
Association football clubs established in 1912
Serie C clubs
Serie A clubs
Serie D clubs
Serie B clubs
1912 establishments in Italy
1944 establishments in Italy
Phoenix clubs (association football)
2009 establishments in Italy
2018 establishments in Italy